Michael Christiaan Dingsdag (born 18 October 1982) is a Dutch former professional footballer who played as a central defender. He is currently working as a youth coach at NAC Breda.

Club career
Born in Amsterdam, Dingsdag began his youth career at the age of six in 1988 in his hometown with DWS, before being scouted in 1999 by Vitesse. After two years in the youth side of Vitesse/AGOVV, he was promoted to the first team of Vitesse in July 2001 competing in the top tier Eredivisie. In five years at the club, he made 90 appearances and scored three goals, before signing with league rivals SC Heerenveen in June 2006.

Dingsdag then enjoyed a five-year stint in Switzerland, with three seasons at FC Sion, and another two at Grasshoppers.

In summer 2015, Dingsdag returned to the Netherlands to sign a two-year deal with Eerste Divisie club NAC Breda. He finished his professional career after one year to become youth coach at NAC. He joined amateur side Veensche Boys at the same time to continue playing at amateur level.

Honours
Heerenveen
KNVB Cup: 2008–09

FC Sion
Swiss Cup: 2010–11

References

External links

 Career stats at Voetbal International 

1982 births
Living people
Footballers from Amsterdam
Association football central defenders
Dutch footballers
AFC DWS players
SBV Vitesse players
SC Heerenveen players
FC Sion players
Grasshopper Club Zürich players
NAC Breda players
Eredivisie players
Swiss Super League players
Eerste Divisie players
Dutch expatriate footballers
Expatriate footballers in Switzerland
Dutch expatriate sportspeople in Switzerland
Dutch football managers
NAC Breda non-playing staff